The Bondage of Fear is a 1917 American silent drama film directed by Travers Vale and starring Ethel Clayton, Edward Kimball, and John Bowers.

Cast
 Ethel Clayton as Vesta Wheatley 
 Edward Kimball as Dr. Jason Wheatley 
 John Bowers as Dick Mortimer 
 Rockliffe Fellowes as John Randolph 
 Arthur Ashley as Skinny Morgan 
 Frances Miller as Mandy Lee 
 William Nash as Rastus 
 George Morgan as Jim 
 Elsie Bambrick as Maisie

References

Bibliography
 Lowe, Denise. An Encyclopedic Dictionary of Women in Early American Films: 1895-1930. Routledge, 2014.

External links
 

1917 films
1917 drama films
1910s English-language films
American silent feature films
Silent American drama films
Films directed by Travers Vale
American black-and-white films
World Film Company films
Films shot in Fort Lee, New Jersey
1910s American films